Pain Kala Gavabar (also Romanized as Pā’īn Kalā Gavābar; also known as Kalākāvar-e Pā’īn) is a village in Malfejan Rural District, in the Central District of Siahkal County, Gilan Province, Iran. At the 2006 census, its population was 100, in 24 families.

References 

Populated places in Siahkal County